Roadies is an American comedy-drama television series created by Cameron Crowe. The series premiered on Showtime on June 26, 2016.

On September 16, 2016, Showtime announced that the series had been canceled after one season.

Cast

Main
Luke Wilson as Bill Hanson, the tour manager of The Staton-House Band, a fictional arena-level group from Denver
Carla Gugino as Shelli Anderson, the tour's production manager
Imogen Poots as Kelly Ann Mason, a recently hired lighting rigger with the Staton-House road crew. She is torn between attending film school and staying on with the band 
Rafe Spall as Reg Whitehead, financial advisor from England
Keisha Castle-Hughes as Donna Mancini, soundboard operator
Peter Cambor as Milo, bass guitar tech 
Colson Baker as Wesley "Wes" Mason, a recently fired Pearl Jam roadie and twin brother of Kelly Ann
Ron White as Phil

Recurring
Catero Alain Colbert as Tom Staton, lead singer of The Staton-House Band
Tanc Sade as Christopher House, guitarist and songwriter of The Staton-House Band
Christopher Backus as Rick, hard-partying bassist with The Staton-House Band
Jacqueline Byers as Natalie Shayne, stalker of The Staton-House Band
Brian Benben as Preston, Staton-House Band manager
Luis Guzmán as Gooch, crew tour bus driver
Finesse Mitchell as Harvey, an accountant with the Staton-House Band road crew
Ethan Michael Mora as Winston, the ill-behaved son of Tom Staton, lead singer of The Staton-House Band
Joy Williams as Janine Beckwith, former girlfriend of Christopher House and subject of Staton-House's most beloved song "Janine"
David Spade as a fictionalized version of himself, star of recurring show-within-the-show Dead Sex

Production
The soundtrack consists of indie music songs, featuring on screen performances and cameo interactions by: The Head and the Heart, Reignwolf, Lindsey Buckingham, The Ting Tings, Lucius, Halsey, Jim James, Phantogram, John Mellencamp, Eddie Vedder, Robyn Hitchcock, Jackson Browne, Greg Leisz, Gary Clark Jr. and Nicole Atkins.

Episodes

Reception
On Metacritic, season one of Roadies holds a score of 47, indicating "mixed or average reviews" based on 30 critics.

Review aggregator Rotten Tomatoes reported that 36% of critics gave the first season a positive review, saying "Roadies' condescending tone, boring and underdeveloped characters, and lack of dramatic intrigue lead to a failure to rock."

References

External links
 
 

2010s American comedy-drama television series
2016 American television series debuts
2016 American television series endings
English-language television shows
Showtime (TV network) original programming
Television shows filmed in Vancouver
Television series by Warner Bros. Television Studios